Cryosophila williamsii, also known as Lago Yojoa palm or root-spine palm is a species of flowering plant in the family Arecaceae. It is found only in Honduras. It is threatened by habitat loss. Cryosophila williamsii is named in honor of prominent botanist Louis Otho Williams.

See also 
 Louis Otho Williams

References

williamsii
Endemic flora of Honduras
Trees of Honduras
Taxonomy articles created by Polbot